Zhongguan is a town in the east of Duchang County in northern Jiangxi province, China, located  from the county seat and just south of G56 Hangzhou–Ruili Expressway. , it has 1 residential community and 8 villages under its administration.

See also 
 List of township-level divisions of Jiangxi

References 

Township-level divisions of Jiangxi
Duchang County